The Derzhprom or Gosprom building is an office building located on Freedom Square in Kharkiv, Ukraine. Built in the Constructivist style, it was the first modern skyscraper building in the Soviet Union upon its completion in 1928. Its name is an abbreviation of two words that, taken together, mean State Industry. In English the structure is known as the State Industry Building or the Palace of Industry.

Derzhprom takes its place as a unique phenomenon of world architecture among the various structures that represent the modernist architecture of the first half of the 20th century, which are already on the UNESCO World Heritage List or the Tentative List.

Overview
The grand opening of the "first Soviet skyscraper" took place on 7 November 1928. 

The building was one of a few showcase projects designed when Kharkiv was the capital of the Ukrainian SSR. It was built by the architects Sergei Serafimov, Samuel Kravets and Mark Felger in only three years. The building became the most spacious single structure in the world by the year of its completion in 1928, to be surpassed by New York's skyscrapers in 1930s. Its unique feature lies in the symmetry which can only be sensed at one point, in the centre of the square. 

The use of concrete in its construction and the system of overhead walkways and individual interlinked towers made the building extremely innovative. The critic Reyner Banham in his Theory and Design in the First Machine Age regarded the building as one of the major architectural achievements of the 1920s, comparable in scale only to the Dessau Bauhaus and the Van Nelle factory in Rotterdam. This allowed the structure to fully survive any destruction attempts during the Second World War. 

In the spring of 1926, it was decided to close the construction due to financial difficulties. Then the head of construction of the State Industry, Pavlo Rottert, left for Moscow, where he managed to find support for the construction from Felix Dzerzhinsky. In March 1926, he returned to build a skyscraper, and in August 1926 it was decided to finance the construction on an extraordinary basis. 

The Derzhprom complex was used as a symbol of modernity in films such as Dziga Vertov's Three Songs about Lenin and Sergei Eisenstein's The General Line. The building's notability was overshadowed following the moving of the Ukrainian capital to Kyiv in 1934, the later denunciation of Constructivism in favour of Stalinist architecture, and the Second World War. More recently, one of its towers was used as a television centre and a TV relay tower was built on its roof.

Interesting facts
 The height of the Derzhprom building is 63 m. With the television tower added in 1955 it was 108 m.
 The office area of the Derzhprom building is 60,000 m²; the areas of the base is 10,760 m².
 The decision to construct the building and to finance it from the Soviet budget was made by Felix Dzherzhinsky in 1926. The cost of the building's construction was 9 million rubles.
 Initially the building was built by hand using primitive instruments such as shovels, wheelbarrows, etc. By the time it was finished the construction techniques employed had been mechanized by 80%. 5,000 workers were involved in its construction, working in three shifts.
 At the time of its completion it was the largest "skyscraper" in the USSR and the second in Europe. 1315 carriages of cement, 9,000 tonnes of metal, 2,700 cars of granite and 40,000 m² of glass were used. 
 The interior walls, windows, door handles, etc., were decorated with an exclusive relief of the letters DHP (ДГП), standing for Industrial Palace (Дом Государственной Промышленности). 
 By the recommendation of the Kharkiv Department of Hygiene, all the door handles were made of copper, which was thought at that time and which is now known to have antibacterial characteristics to kill microbes.
 7 of the 12 original elevators still function without having being replaced since 1928.
 The length of the bridges that unite the three sections of the buildings is 26 metres. 
 The fifth entrance has a museum created in 1980, dedicated to the building and to the Kharkiv writer Z. Zvonytsky.
 The reconstruction and renovation of the Derzhprom building took more time (seven years) than the construction of the building itself (three years).

Architecture 
Gosprom is a symbol of Kharkiv as an industrial, modern and big city.

The architecture of Gosprom has international Constructivism, its forms are industrial. The house has a high aesthetic potential and functionality; its construction is compared to a "communication leap". In the 1920s, such architecture was a novelty not only in Europe but also around the world.

Architectural functionalism includes the following functions:

 Utilitarian – a place for industrial management activities in Ukraine.
 Ideological – the disclosure of the idea of industrialization as a progressive phenomenon.
 Social – a spacious center of the new Kharkiv, a socially significant object of government, a place of mass events such as holidays and demonstrations.
 Symbolic – "organized world", a symbol of a new era and of industrialization.
 Compositional – dominance in the spatial structure of the city; connecting the spaces of the square and the city; demarcation of the square and the city (at the level of the square). 
 Symatic – laconic forms that lead to archetypal schemes; inclusion in the symbolism of the landscape.

See also 
 Freedom Square (Kharkiv)

References

External links
 1930s photographs by Robert Byron 
 Article on the building 
 View during the war
 Photos by Luftwaffe pilots during World War II, some of the Derzhprom building
 Photo of the Derzhprom building
 Derzhprom/Gosprom building, photographs by Georges Dedoyard and others, Canadian Centre for Architecture (digitized items)

Buildings and structures in Kharkiv
Buildings and structures built in the Soviet Union
Commercial buildings completed in 1928
Constructivist architecture
1928 establishments in the Soviet Union
World Heritage Tentative List